The U-18 Women's Softball World Cup is a fastpitch softball tournament for age 18-and-under national teams held by the World Baseball Softball Confederation (WBSC). Prior to the 2021 edition, the tournament was an under-19 tournament.

Results

Notes

Medal table

See also
 U-18 Men's Softball World Cup

References

World championships in softball
Recurring sporting events established in 1981
World Baseball Softball Confederation competitions
Under-18 sport